
Gmina Rybczewice is a rural gmina (administrative district) in Świdnik County, Lublin Voivodeship, in eastern Poland.

Villages
Gmina Rybczewice contains the villages and settlements of Bazar, Choiny, Częstoborowice, Izdebno, Izdebno-Kolonia, Pilaszkowice Drugie, Pilaszkowice Pierwsze, Podizdebno, Rybczewice, Rybczewice Pierwsze, Stryjno Drugie, Stryjno Pierwsze, Stryjno-Kolonia, Wygnanowice and Zygmuntów.

Neighbouring gminas
Gmina Rybczewice is bordered by the gminas of Fajsławice, Gorzków, Krzczonów, Łopiennik Górny, Piaski and Żółkiewka.

References

Polish official population figures 2006

Rybczewice
Świdnik County